Arlen Lee "Arnie" Hauge (born June 28, 1941) is an American former politician. He served in the South Dakota Senate from 2007 to 2008.

References

1941 births
Living people
People from McCook County, South Dakota
Businesspeople from South Dakota
Republican Party South Dakota state senators